3-D, 3D, or 3d may refer to:

Science, technology, and mathematics

Relating to three-dimensionality
 Three-dimensional space 
 3D computer graphics, computer graphics that use a three-dimensional representation of geometric data
 3D film, a motion picture that gives the illusion of three-dimensional perception
 3D modeling, developing a representation of any three-dimensional surface or object
 3D printing, making a three-dimensional solid object of a shape from a digital model
 3D display, a type of information display that conveys depth to the viewer
 3D television, television that conveys depth perception to the viewer
 Stereoscopy, any technique capable of recording three-dimensional visual information or creating the illusion of depth in an image

Other uses in science and technology or commercial products
 3D projection
 3D rendering
 3D scanning, making a digital representation of three-dimensional objects
 3D video game (disambiguation)
 3-D Secure, a secure protocol for online credit and debit card transactions
 Biela's Comet, a lost periodic comet discovered in 1826
 British Rail Class 207, sometimes known as 3Ds

Music

Artists
 Robert Del Naja (born 1965), also known as 3D, English artist and musician in the band Massive Attack
 The 3Ds, a rock band

Albums
 3D (Go West album), 2010
 3D (The Three Degrees album), 1979
 3-D (I See Stars album), the debut album from the band I See Stars
 3-D (SPC ECO album)
 3-D (TLC album), 2002
 3-D (Wrathchild America album)

Songs
"3-D", a song by Cheap Trick from their 1983 album Next Position Please

Other uses
 3D Aerobatics, a form of flying using flying aircraft to perform specific aerial maneuvers
 3D (Long Island bus), bus service in New York State
 3D Test of Antisemitism, put forth by Israeli politician and human rights activist Natan Sharansky
 Middle finger, the third digit (abbreviated 3D) of the hand
 Three-dimensional chess
 Threepence (disambiguation), a coin used in several countries, abbreviated as '3d'
 The 3D ("Dudley Death Drop"), a professional wrestling double-team maneuver

See also
 3ds (disambiguation)
 D3 (disambiguation)
 DDD (disambiguation)
 
 3rd (disambiguation)